The University of Gothenburg is a university in Sweden's second largest city, Gothenburg. Founded in 1891, the university is the third-oldest of the current Swedish universities and, with 37,000 students and 6,000 staff members, it is one of the largest universities in the Nordic countries.

About 
With its eight faculties and 38 departments, the University of Gothenburg is one of the most wide-ranging and versatile universities in Sweden. Its eight faculties offer training in the Creative Arts, Social Sciences, Natural Sciences, Humanities, Education, Information Technology, Business, Economics and Law, and Health Sciences.

The University of Gothenburg has the highest number of applicants per study place in many of its subjects and courses, making it one of the most popular universities in Sweden.

History 

The University of Gothenburg was founded as Göteborgs högskola (Gothenburg University College) in 1891. In 1907 it was granted the same status as Uppsala University and Lund University by the Swedish government, thus creating Sweden's third university.

Over the course of time, it has merged with a number of previously independent higher education institutions in the city and has continuously expanded its study profile. It was granted the rights of a full university by the Swedish Government in 1954, following the merger of the Göteborgs högskola (Gothenburg College) with the Medicinhögskolan i Göteborg (Gothenburg Medical School).

In 1971, the originally separate Gothenburg School of Economics and Commercial Law became part of the University of Gothenburg.

Sahlgrenska University Hospital is associated with the university as a teaching hospital. The Sahlgrenska Hospital was founded in 1772 following a donation by Niclas Sahlgren, and is the largest in Northern Europe.

In the 1990s the School of Economics and the Academy of Music, Drama and Opera have moved to new buildings in the city centre. A new campus for the Faculty of Education (teacher training) was opened in central Gothenburg in 2006.

The University of Gothenburg is a pronounced city university, that is most of its facilities are within the city centre of Gothenburg. The main building as well as most faculties are located in the central part of Gothenburg.

Gothenburg has a great academic excellence, originating from the University of Gothenburg, Chalmers University of Technology and the Sahlgrenska University Hospital, to face these challenges. It has a strong tradition of innovation, resulting in for example Losec, the Brånemark implant, drugs against Parkinson's and most recently, the first ever completed pregnancy from a transplanted uterus. 
Together with Uppsala, Lund, and Stockholm universities, it is one of four large international research universities in Sweden.

Structure

Management

The University of Gothenburg is one of Sweden's largest universities. It is a comprehensive university, organised into eight faculties and 38 departments. The university is a public authority as well as a confederation of Faculty Boards. Each faculty/school has significant autonomy based on its attributed powers, and a distinct identity within the university.

The University Board is the university's highest decision-making body. The board consists of 15 members and has "supervision over all the University’s affairs, and is responsible that its duties are fulfilled".  The Swedish Government appoints seven of the members externally, based on their having experience in activities that have significance for the university's teaching and research functions. In addition, the vice-chancellor, three faculty members and three students, as well as union representatives are included as ordinary members.

The day-to-day management is headed by the vice-chancellor, who is responsible for implementing the decisions of the board. She is supported by the central administration.

Faculties

The university is organised into eight academic faculties. Collaboration across faculty and subject boundaries is emphasised in the university's research and education strategies. All faculties takes advantage of this possibility and are active participants in a multitude of cross-disciplinary research and education activities within the framework of the university. The university closely cooperates with Chalmers University of Technology, a fact that further increases the total scope of the academic environment in Gothenburg.
 
 The Faculty of Fine, Applied and Performing Arts (Konstnärliga fakulteten) offers courses in the fields of design and crafts, film studies, photography, scene, music and fine arts. The Göteborg Organ Art Center, HDK, Högskolan för scen och musik, and Valand Academy are part of the faculty.
 The Faculty of Education (Utbildningsvetenskapliga fakulteten) is responsible for teacher training in various subjects.
 The Faculty of Arts (Humanistiska fakulteten) comprises the humanities, for instance cultural studies, history, literature, history of ideas, religion, modern languages, philosophy, linguistics, theory of science and Swedish language and literature

 The IT Faculty (IT fakulteten) offers programmes in applied information technology, computer science and engineering.
 The Faculty of Science (Naturvetenskapliga fakulteten) covers a number of science disciplines such as botany, cell and molecular biology, physics, earth sciences, chemistry, conservation, marine ecology, mathematics, environmental science, and zoology.
 The Sahlgrenska Academy (Sahlgrenska Akadamin) is part of the University of Gothenburg and functions as a separate academy with the prestigious Sahlgrenska University Hospital.
 The School of Business, Economics and Law (Handelshögskolan vid Göteborgs universitet) is a business school and a law school.
 The Faculty of Social Sciences (Samhällsvetenskapliga fakulteten) offers courses in peace and development studies, public administration, journalism, psychology, social anthropology, social work, sociology, political science, and European studies.

 Other 
 The Swedish Secretariat for Gender Research' is a unit of about 30 staff which was formed in 1998.

World ranking
University of Gothenburg places well in local and global rankings and is usually positioned among the world's best for life sciences and medicine. It was ranked 2nd in Sweden, 11th in Europe and 31st in the world in the subjects of biological and life sciences by AWRU-Shanghai 2018 world ranking.

 Noted people 
Alumni

 Percy Barnevik, industry leader, former CEO of Asea Brown Boveri
 Nick Bostrom, philosopher and futurist, and Director of the Future of Humanity Institute at Oxford University
 Malin Byström, operatic soprano
 Magnus Carlsson, singer
 Martin Wallström, actor
 Jan Eliasson, diplomat and politician (former President of the United Nations General Assembly, former Minister of Foreign Affairs of the Kingdom of Sweden)
 Hans Hagnell, politician
 Carl Henrik Fredriksson, literary critic, columnist, essayist, and translator
 Cecilia Malmström, politician (European Commissioner)
 Aleksandra Mir, visual artist
 Njuguna Ndungu, economist, Governor and Chairman of the Board of the Central Bank of Kenya
 Susanna Roxman, Anglophone poet and critic
 Juri Kurol, Swedish Orthodontist
 Maria Wetterstrand, politician (Green Party)
 Muhammad al-Yaqoubi, Syrian Islamic scholar
 Ann-Sofie Johansson, Creative Advisor and former Head of Design for H&M
 Jonas Jonasson, author of The Hundred-Year-Old Man Who Climbed Out the Window and Disappeared''.

 Sture Allén, computer linguist, former permanent secretary of the Swedish Academy
 Jens Allwood, linguist
 Dilruba Z. Ara, writer
 Arvid Carlsson, Nobel Prize laureate in Medicine, 2000
 Ernst Cassirer, philosopher
 Östen Dahl, linguist (member of the Royal Swedish Academy of Sciences, Royal Swedish Academy of Letters, History and Antiquities and Academia Europaea)
 Åke Edwardson, author (used to teach Journalism)
 Gunnar D Hansson, author
 Tore Janson, linguist.
 Bernhard Karlgren, sinologist
 Nils Kock, developer of the Kock pouch surgical procedure
 Lotta Lotass, writer and literary scholar (former Member of the Swedish Academy)
 Erik Lönnroth, historian (Member of the Swedish Academy)
 Joakim Norbeck, scientist in molecular biotechnology at Chalmers University
 Bo Ralph, linguist (Member of the Swedish Academy)
 Bo Rothstein, political scientist
 Gudrun Slettengren-Fernholm, artist
 Anna Wåhlin, Antarctic researcher, oceanographer
 Agnes Wold, professor of clinical bacteriology
 José González, singer

Honorary degrees
The University of Gothenburg has awarded numerous honorary doctorates to public figures and excellent academics, including:
 Vigdís Finnbogadóttir, President of Iceland 1980–1996 (honorary doctorate 1990)
 Hillary Clinton, politician (honorary doctorate, 2007)
 David Cox, statistician (honorary doctorate 2007)
 Linda Haas, sociologist

Past rectors 
 1891 Axel Kock
 1891–1893 Hjalmar Edgren
 1893–1899 Johannes Paulson
 1899–1909 Johan Vising
 1909–1914 Ludvig Stavenow
 1914–1931 Otto Sylwan
 1931–1936 Bernhard Karlgren
 1936–1951 Curt Weibull
 1951–1966 Hjalmar Frisk
 1966–1972 Bo Eric Ingelmark
 1972–1982 Georg Lundgren
 1982–1986 Kjell Härnqvist
 1986–1992 Jan S. Nilsson
 1992–1997 Jan Ling
 1997–2003 Bo Samuelsson
 2003–2006 Gunnar Svedberg
 2006–2017 Pam Fredman
 2017– Eva Wiberg

See also 
 Chalmers University of Technology
 GOArt
 Gothenburg quadricentennial jubilee
 List of universities in Sweden
 Royal Society of Sciences and Letters in Gothenburg
 The International Science Festival in Gothenburg
 Sahlgrenska University Hospital

References

External links

 University of Gothenburg – Official site
 University of Gothenburg alumni network
 slide-show

 
Gothenburg
Educational institutions established in 1891
1891 establishments in Sweden
Universities established in the 20th century